XHZT-FM is a radio station on 95.5 FM in Puebla City, Mexico. It is owned by Tribuna Comunicación and known as La Magnífica FM.

History

XEZT-AM 1250 received its concession on November 26, 1970. It was owned by Juan Bautista Ponce de León Terán and sold to the current concessionaire in 1976.

On July 14, 2017, the Federal Telecommunications Institute (IFT) approved the migration of XEZT to FM as XHZT-FM 95.5, but the station did not pay the fee to migrate. The frequency was then awarded to XEHIT-AM to migrate as XHHIT-FM, which signed on in November 2018.

Until 2018, XEZT carried the La Mejor grupera format from MVS Radio. The station left the network in September 2018 but returned to grupera under the "La Magnífica" name in October 2019.

It later emerged that an error by the IFT led to Tribuna Comunicación underpaying the required fee to migrate, an error also made with respect to the migration of XEEG-AM 1280. Tribuna sued the IFT in court and successfully won an order to have 95.5 made available for its use. In 2020, XHHIT-FM was moved to 105.5 MHz in compliance with the court order; on November 24, 2021, La Magnífica then launched on FM.

References

Mass media in Puebla (city)
Radio stations in Puebla